The 2011 African Olympic Qualifier was the second edition of the African field hockey qualification tournament for the Summer Olympics for men and women. It was held from 2 to 11 September in Bulawayo, Zimbabwe.

Six teams competed in the men's tournament, while four women's teams participated. The winner of each tournament qualified for the field hockey competition at the 2012 Summer Olympics. More teams were originally entered, but later withdrew.

Men's tournament

Pool

Classification round

Fifth and sixth place

The game was not played, Zimbabwe finished 5th, Morocco in 6th place.

Third and fourth place

Final

Final standings

 Qualified for the 2012 Summer Olympics

 Qualified for the Olympic qualification tournaments

Women's tournament

Pool

Third place game

Final

References

External links
African hockey site

African Olympic Qualifier
African Olympic Qualifier
Field hockey at the Summer Olympics – African qualification
Sport in Bulawayo
2011 in Zimbabwean sport
International field hockey competitions hosted by Zimbabwe